Sarcococca (sweet box or Christmas box) is a genus of 11 species of flowering plants in the box family Buxaceae, native to eastern and southeastern Asia and the Himalayas. The leaves are borne alternately, 3–12 cm long and 1–4 cm broad. 

The plants bear fragrant white flowers, often in winter. The fruit is a red or black drupe containing 1–3 seeds. Some species are cultivated as groundcover or low hedging in moist, shady areas. The basic chromosome number for genus is 14 (2n = 28).

The genus name Sarcococca comes from the Greek σάρξ (sárx) and κόκκος (kókkos) for "fleshy berry", referring to the black fruit.

Selected species

Sarcococca confusa Sealy – Sweet box
Sarcococca hookeriana Baill. 
Sarcococca humilis Stapf
Sarcococca longifolia M. Cheng
Sarcococca longipetiolata M. Cheng
Sarcococca orientalis C. Y. Wu
Sarcococca pruniformis (Saracodine courier) 
Sarcococca ruscifolia Stapf
Sarcococca saligna (D. Don) Mull.-Arg.
Sarcococca vagans Stapf
Sarcococca wallichii Stapf
Sarcococca zeylanica Baill.

References

Flora of Pakistan: Sarcococca
Flora of China: Sarcococca species list

 
Eudicot genera